Burlington is a village in Kane County, Illinois, United States. The population was 535 at the 2020 census, down from 618 in 2010. It was incorporated as a village on November 6, 1990.

History
Burlington was platted by Andrew Pingree in 1851. It was named after the Burlington Northern Railroad, which runs through the south edge of the village. In 1878, the area had three cheese factories, a general store, a hotel and a saloon. A post office under the name "Burlington" has been in operation since 1906. The last dairy plant closed in the 1970s.

Since the early 1990s, Burlington has been home to two small plastics companies. Concerns have been raised over the environmental impact these plants will have on the town and surrounding areas in the future. On November 6, 1990, Burlington was incorporated as a village, along with nearby Lily Lake and Virgil, in an effort to establish stricter guidelines in regards to plastic manufacturing and chemical dumping in the area.

From 1910 to 2019, Burlington held an annual fall festival on the first week of September every year. Burlington is one of 4 villages in the State of Illinois that allow the use of snowmobiles in town during the winter season.

Geography
Burlington is located at  (42.052112, -88.548290) near the intersection of Plank Road and Burlington Road. The village cosists of a small "downtown" section, and is surrounded mostly by horse ranches and cornfields. It lies approximately halfway between Elgin and Sycamore, and is 20 miles north of the City of Aurora.

Demographics

As of the census of 2000, there were 452 people, 171 households, and 127 families residing in the village. The racial makeup of the village was 96.90% White, 1.33% Asian, 0.22% from other races, and 1.55% from two or more races. Hispanic or Latino of any race were 0.66% of the population.

There were 171 households, out of which 39.8% had children under the age of 18 living with them, 58.5% were married couples living together, 8.8% had a female householder with no husband present, and 25.7% were non-families. 21.1% of all households were made up of individuals, and 10.5% had someone living alone who was 65 years of age or older.  The average household size was 2.64 and the average family size was 3.07.

In the village, the population was spread out, with 29.0% under the age of 18, 9.3% from 18 to 24, 31.2% from 25 to 44, 20.6% from 45 to 64, and 10.0% who were 65 years of age or older.  The median age was 34 years. For every 100 females, there were 84.5 males.  For every 100 females age 18 and over, there were 85.5 males.

The median income for a household in the village was $53,438, and the median income for a family was $59,886. Males had a median income of $49,375 versus $32,031 for females. The per capita income for the village was $25,349.  About 1.7% of families and 5.7% of the population were below the poverty line, including 4.3% of those under age 18 and 5.1% of those age 65 or over.

Schools 

Burlington is home to Central High School, Central Middle School, and Howard B. Thomas Grade School, all of which serve School District 301.

References

External links

Villages in Illinois
Villages in Kane County, Illinois